Mantua Township is a township in Monroe County, Iowa, United States.

History
Mantua Township was organized in 1845.

References

Townships in Monroe County, Iowa
Townships in Iowa